Anakkara is a village and grama panchayat in Pattambi taluk, Palakkad district, Kerala, India. It is located on the southern bank of Bharathappuzha river (Nila, Ponnani River, or Kuttippuram River). Anakkara is located about 8 km south of Kuttippuram town. It was a part of Ponnani taluk until 16 June 1969. The border Grama Panchayats of Anakkara are Kuttipuram and Irimbiliyam in Tirur Taluk, Thavanur, Kalady, and Vattamkulam in Ponnani taluk, and Parudur and Pattithara in Pattambi Taluk.

Demographics
 India census, Anakkara had a population of 22,601 with 10,701 males and 11,900 females.

Suburbs and Villages
 Melazhiyam
 Kumbidi & Ummathur
 Panniyur & Nayyur
 Perumbalam
 Mundrakode & DIET Road
 Manniyam perumbalam
 Kudallur & Malamalkavu

Important Landmarks

Panniyur Sri Varahamurthy Temple
 Anakkara Shiva Temple 
 Sree Kodalil Vamanamurthi Temple & Bagavathy Temple - Perumbalam                                                                                                                                    
DIET Lab School (by promoting Swamy Natha Vidyalaya in 1992) https://www.dietpalakkad.org
 GHS School, Anakkara
 AWH Collage Of science & Technology Anakkara
 GTJB School Kumbidi
 Anakkara Vadakkath' Tharavad (Captain Lakshmi's Home)                               
 Govindakrishna Smaraka Vayanasala

References 

Villages in Palakkad district
Gram panchayats in Palakkad district